Drift Creek Wilderness is a  wilderness area in the Siuslaw National Forest on the Oregon Coast. It was created in 1984, along with two other small wilderness areas in the forest - Cummins Creek Wilderness and Rock Creek Wilderness. Drift Creek was named for the accumulations of driftwood on its banks.

Human history
Natives of the Alsea tribe used to hunt and gather berries in Drift Creek Wilderness and the surrounding area.  Later, in the early 20th century, American settlers tried unsuccessfully to homestead the wilderness.  Fred Purath operated a subsistence farm and ran a few head of cattle.  When he died in the early 1940s his land was purchased by Earl Harris.  The only relic of the so-called Harris Ranch homestead is a moss-covered stove and stove parts along the Harris Ranch Trail.

Vegetation

It contains one of the largest remaining stands of old growth in the Coast Range. Sitka spruce, western hemlock, western red cedar, and Douglas fir dominate the area, but bigleaf maple and red alder can be found as well. Much of the underbrush is licorice fern, oxalis, salmonberry, thimbleberry, huckleberry, foxglove, trillium, sword fern, and salal.

Wildlife
Roosevelt elk, black-tailed deer, and black bear share Drift Creek Wilderness with two endangered Oregon species - the northern spotted owl and the bald eagle.  In autumn, Chinook and coho salmon, as well as steelhead and coastal cutthroat trout use Drift Creek, a tributary of the Alsea River, to spawn.

Recreation
Primary recreational activities in Drift Creek Wilderness include hiking, hunting, fishing, and wildlife watching. Fishing is managed for native fish only. Horseback riding is prohibited due to the fragility of the soil.

See also
 List of Oregon Wildernesses
 List of U.S. Wilderness Areas
 List of old growth forests
 Wilderness Act

References

Gallery

External links
 Siuslaw National Forest

Siuslaw National Forest
Wilderness areas of Oregon
Oregon Coast Range
Protected areas of Lincoln County, Oregon
Old-growth forests
Oregon Coast
IUCN Category Ib
1984 establishments in Oregon
Protected areas established in 1984